Zhu Biao (10 October 1355  17 May 1392) was the Hongwu Emperor's eldest son and crown prince of the Ming dynasty. His early death created a crisis in the dynasty's first succession that was resolved by the successful usurpation of his brother Zhu Di as the Yongle Emperor, an act with far-reaching consequences for the future of China.

While his father completed his rebellion against the Yuan dynasty, Zhu Biao was generally kept away from the front lines and provided with the most esteemed Confucian scholars of his time as tutors. Particularly by comparison with his father or brother, Zhu Biao is remembered as being soft-hearted. The official History of Ming records him once questioning his father why so many of the ministers and generals who had aided him in forming the Ming Empire were being rewarded with death or banishment. His father replied that they were like thorns on a vine; not trusting Zhu Biao to do it himself, the Hongwu Emperor was kindly removing them before passing it on to his son.

Like his son, the Jianwen Emperor, Zhu Biao had a deep appreciation for traditional Chinese culture: he was involved in a survey of Xi'an and Luoyang as potential capitals for the dynasty when he fell ill and died in 1392 at the age of 36. He was posthumously honored with the title Crown Prince Yiwen by his father and Xingzong, Emperor Xiaokang by his son.

After his younger brother Zhu Di usurped the throne, he was posthumously demoted back to Crown Prince Yiwen. During the Southern Ming, he was again posthumously restored as Xingzong and Emperor Xiaokang.

Generation Poem
After his first son, Zhu Xiongying, Zhu Biao followed the practice of including a generation name into the personal names of his other children. The names followed a generation poem:

This poem would've governed the first character of the personal names of the next 20 emperors of China, but only the first two were officially ever used. After the usurpation of the Prince of Yan, the Jianwen Emperor was said to have died in a fire and his surviving children were killed or kept in isolation to prevent rivals from the throne, and the younger sons of Zhu Biao were also kept under house arrest or killed. But during Republic of China, the politician Wang Pixu (王丕煦) wrote a county chronicle for Laiyang, in which it was recorded that Zhu Yuntong had many descendants there through his son Zhu Wenkun (朱文坤).

Family

Consorts and Issue:
 Empress Xiaokang, of the Chang clan (1355–1378)
 Zhu Xiongying, Prince Huai of Yu (1 December 1374 – 12 June 1382), first son
 Zhu Yuntong, Prince Dao of Wu (29 November 1378 – 1 September 1417), third son
 Crown Princess Yiwen, of the Lü clan (1359–1412)
 Zhu Yunwen, the Jianwen Emperor (b. 5 December 1377), second son
 Zhu Yunjian, Prince Min of Heng (27 July 1385 – 1402), fourth son
 Zhu Yunxi, Prince Jian of Xu (13 July 1391 – 3 February 1407), fifth son
 Unknown
 Princess Jiangdu, first daughter
 Married Geng Xuan, the first son of Geng Bingwen, in 1394
 Princess Yilun, second daughter
 Married Yu Li in 1417
 Third daughter
 Princess Nanping (d. 1412), fourth daughter

Ancestry

References

1355 births
1392 deaths
Ming dynasty imperial princes
Yongle Emperor
Burials in Nanjing
Heirs apparent who never acceded
Sons of emperors